Piergiorgio Colautti (born 16 October 1934, Rome, Kingdom of Italy) is modern Italian painter and sculptor, who lives and works in Rome. He is known for his own distinctive style, sometimes labelled "Hyperfuturism", in which figurative elements are enmeshed and submerged by symbols reflecting a cold and modern technological world.

Life and work
Piergiorgio (Pio Giorgio) Colautti was born in the family of sculptor. When the Second World War began, he moved to Veneto where he attended school of design, worked and socialized with the greatest Venetian painters. His works were first introduced to public as part of the exhibitions in Pordenone, Venice and Mestre. Then he took part in exhibitions held in Ancona and Macerata, where he moved in 1955. In 1958, Colautti returned to Rome where he attended Rome's School of Ornamental Art in Via San Giacomo. At the same time, along with other artists, Colautti presented his works in the exposition of Via Margutta.

In Rome his talent was recognized by Alberto Ziveri, who was his tutor and mentor during 5 years. It was Ziveri who pushed Piergiorgio towards the idea of personal exhibition. His first personal exhibition was held in 1958 at "La Scaletta" art gallery, where the greatest celebrities of the "Roman school" had made their first entry "into society". Colautti has exhibited in France, USA, Italy, Canada, Germany, Great Britain, etc.

Besides paintings, Colautti practices frescoes, wall paintings, lithography and sculptures. Also, being inspired by the works of his famous grandfather, Arturo Colautti, Piergiorgio follows the journalistic path. His articles about the rigors of the professional artist's life were and are still being published by "Inciucio", a low-budget Italian version of People Magazine. In addition, in 1982 his poetry was published in the collection of poems titled "L'altra alternativa"

His works are in many public and private collections in Italy and abroad.

Exhibitions

Personal
 1962: Galleria di San Luca – Rome
 1963: Galleria comunale d'arte moderna e contemporanea – Rome
 1964: Galleria Porfiri – Rome
 1965, 1967, 1972: Galleria Secolo XIX – Rome
 1966: Galleria La Scaletta – Rome
 1968, 1971: Galleria Il Pozzo – Città di Castello
 1969: Galleria Tritone al Nazareno – Rome
 1970: Circolo di Cultura Popolare Monte Sacro – Rome
 1971: Art Gallery "Ponte Sisto" – Rome
 1973: Galleria d'arte "Il Trifalco" – Rome
 1976: Expo New York – New York City
 1976, 1978: "Circolo Cittadino" – Alba Adriatica 
 1978: "Expo Arte Bari" – Bari 
 1978: Palazzo Comunale San Remo – Sanremo
 1979: Galleria "Magazzeni" – Giulianova 
 1980: Fiera del Turismo di Stoccarda – Stuttgart in Germany
 1980, 1982: Galleria "Lo Scanno" – L'Aquila 
 1981: Galleria d'Arte Contemporanea "Studio C" – Rome 
 1983, 1984: Galleria "La Banana" – Martinsicuro
 1983: Galleria Palazzo Comunale Tortoreto – Tortoreto
 1985: Galleria "Ghelfi" – Verona
 1985: Galleria Sistina – Rome 
 1986: Galleria D'Urso – Rome  
 1987: Galleria Comunale Palazzo Esposizioni – Rome 
 1988: Personale Fiera di Roma – Rome 
 1988: Galleria Palazzo Valentini – Rome  
 1989: Castello Cinquecentesco – L'Aquila
 1990: Galleria d'Arte 28 – Rome  
 1991: Galleria Palazzo Camerale Allumiere – Allumiere in the Province of Rome
 1992: Associazione Friuli nel Mondo – Rome  
 1994: Galleria Palazzo Camerale Allumiere – Allumiere in the Province of Rome
 1995: Scuola Comunale Allumiere – Allumiere in the Province of Rome
 1995: Palazzo del Turismo Terminillo – Rieti
 1996: Palazzo Comunale Tortoreto Lido – Tortoreto

Group
 1963: Galleria Sistina – Rome
 1964: Mostra Nazionale d'Incisione – Cagliari
 1964: Mostra Mercato Nazionale d'Arte Contemporanea – Rome
 1964, 1965: Mostra Concorso Arti Figurative – Rome
 1965: Exhibition of Fiesole – Fiesole
 1965: Exhibition of Puccini – Ancona
 1965: Exhibition of Prato – Prato
 1966: Exhibition of Pittori Romani – Arezzo
 1966: Galleria D'Urso – Rome
 1967: Exhibition of ACLI, Galleria Comunale – Rome
 1967: Galleria Laurina – Rome
 1967-1972: Permanente Galleria Scaligera – Montecatini Terme
 1967-1972: Exhibition in Città di Castello
 1969: Exhibition in Salsomaggiore Terme
 1969: Exhibition of Italian painters – Canada
 1969: Exhibition of Italian Landscape – New York City
 1969: Collective Contemporary Painters – Avignon, Paris, Marseille
 1969: Biennale d'Arte Contemporanea – Monterotondo
 1971: Exhibition of Mario Sironi – Naples
 1971: Collective Contemporary Painters – Fiera Milano – Milan
 1971: National Exhibition in Prato
 1971: National Exhibition in Cavazzo – Modena 
 1972: Exhibition "Natale oggi" – Rome
 1972: Esposizione Internazionale Canina – Sanremo
 1972: Mostra firme celebri – Alassio
 1972: Art Gallery "Ponte Sisto" – Rome
 1972: Exhibition in Cortina d'Ampezzo
 1972: Exhibition of Rotavact Club – Lucca
 1972: Exhibition of Grafica – Arezzo
 1972: Exhibition in Santa Margherita Ligure
 1977: "Omaggio a San Francesco nel 750 anniversario della morte" – Assisi 
 1977, 1978: "Festival nazionale d'Arte Grafica" – Salerno 
 1978: Premio "Siena" – Siena 
 1978: VI Biennale d'Arte Palazzo Reale – Milano 
 1979: Mostra "Lazio 79" – Rome 
 1979: Mostra "Premio Spoleto" – Spoleto 
 1979: Mostra "Premio Norcia" – Norcia
 1979: Premio "Unicef" – Galleria "Capricorno" – Rome 
 1979: "La donna nell'Arte" – Galleria "Capricorno" – Rome 
 1979: "Arte Giovane, Resistenza, Attualità" – Domodossola 
 1980: "Arte e Ferrovia" – Bologna 
 1981, 1989, 1992: "Premio Salvi" – piccola Europa – Sassoferrato (AN) 
 1982: "Expo di Bari" – Bari 
 1982, 1985: "Expo Tevere" – Rome 
 1984: "Expo Arte" – Bari, Basel and in New York City
 1983: "III Biennale d'Arte" – La Spezia 
 1984: "VI Biennale d Arte Palazzo Reale" – Milano 
 1985: "VII Biennale d'Arte" – Gabrovo, Bulgaria
 1985: Premio Santià – Santhià 
 1985: Arte e Satira Politica – Gabrovo, Bulgaria
 1986: Arte e Umorismo nell'Arte – Tolentino
 1987: "V Biennale d'Arte" – La Spezia 
 1988: Mostra Nazionale D'Arte Santià – Santhià 
 1990: Festival della Satira Politica – Gabrovo, Bulgaria 
 1991: XV Biennale Internazionale dell'Umorismo nell'Arte Tolentino – Tolentino
 1992: Triennale Internazionale Scultura Osaka – Osaka, Japan
 1993: Triennale Internazionale Pittura Osaka – Osaka, Japan
 1994: Galleria "Magazzeni" – Giulianova 
 1995: Galleria d'Arte Contemporanea "Studio C" – Rome 
 Quadriennale d'Arte di Roma – Rome
 Mostra Nazionale Cavasso – Modena
 Mostra (Asta) Finarte – Milano

Artworks in museums

Italy
 Omaggio a San Francesco nel 350 della pinacoteca di Assisi
 Museum Ebraico di Arte Contemporanea – Rome
 Museum Agostinelli – Acilia (Rome)
 Museum Madonna del Divino Amore (Rome)
 Pinacoteca dell'Antoniano – Bologna
 Alassio – Muretto degli artisti
 Pinacoteca Comune di Albano di Lucania – Potenza
 Museum della Resistenza di Domodossola – Novara
 Museum della Pinacoteca Comunale – Roseto degli Abruzzi (Teramo)
 Museum della Pinacoteca Comunale di Giulianova – Teramo
 Pinacoteca del Comune di Tortoreto – Teramo
 Pinacoteca del Comune de L'Aquila
 Pinacoteca del Comune di Tolentino – Macerata
 Pinacoteca del Comune di Rieti
 Pinacoteca di Arte contemporanea di Povoleto (Udine)

Abroad
 House of Humor and Satire in Gabrovo – Bulgaria
 Bertrand Russell Foundation Art Gallery – Cambridge University (Great Britain)
 Folk Traditions Museum of Bucovina – Romania
 Staatsgalerie Stuttgart – Germany

Selected awards
 1963: Premio Targa D'Argento come fondatore del gruppo Gli Ellittici
 1968: Award, Montecatini Terme
 1969: Award and gold medal, Salsomaggiore Terme
 1970: Mostra Collettiva, Parco dei Principi – Rome
 1970: Gold Medal, Fiano Romano
 1972: Silver Medal, P. Schweitzer – Modena
 1973: Gold Medal, Comune di Cortina d'Ampezzo – Cortina d'Ampezzo
 2012: Premio Van Gogh, Accademia Delle Avanguardie Artistiche – Palermo

Quotes and criticism comments
 Gaetano Maria Bonifati 
 Maurizio Calvesi
 Virgilio Guzzi 
 Stanislao Nievo
 Mario Penelope
 Guido Della Martora
 Mario Monteverdi
 Ugo Moretti
 Gianni Gaspari (TG2)
 Duilio Morosini 
 Sergio Massimo Greci 
 Mario Forti (GR3)
 Anna Iozzino
 C. Norelli
 Augusto Giordano
 De Roberti
 Vittorio Adorno
 Francesco Boneschi
 Federico Menna
 S. Di Dionisio
 P.A. De Martino
 Giulio Salierno
 Elio Mercuri 
 Dario Micacchi

References

Bibliography

 Who's who in German: Biographisches Kompendium in deutscher Sprache, Schellmann, 1999, page 273
 L’elite 2001, selezione Arte italiana, page 386 
 L’elite 2004, selezione Arte italiana, page 382
 L’elite 2008, selezione Arte italiana, page 386
 L’elite 2010, selezione Arte italiana, page 310
 L’elite 2011, selezione Arte italiana, page 314
 L’elite 2012, selezione Arte italiana, page 284
 Ente nazionale manifestazione d’arte, un anno d’arte, Fabbri editori, 1986, page 293
 Piergiorgio Colautti: proposte e ricerca estetica: opere dal 1957 al 1977, Piergiorgio Colautti, 1977
 Catalogo Bolaffi d’arte moderna, il collezionista d’arte moderna, volume 1, 1970, page 134
 50 anni di friuli a Roma, Regione Autonoma Friuli Venezia Giulia, 2002, page 129
 ARTE e Collezionismo 2012, Gallery Edition, volume XI, page 417
 ARTE e Collezionismo 2013, Gallery Edition, volume XII, page 188
 XV Biennale Internazionale Dell’umorismo nell’arte, Tolentino 1989, page 65
 XL Rassegna D’arte, G.B. Salvi e piccolo Europa, 1990, page 34
 Al Friuli vicino, Piero Isola, 2003, Vecchiarelli Editore, page 10, 72-73
 Ciao 2001, No.29, 1975, page 61
 MID TIMES, Volume 3, No.35, May 1980, page 67
 Fogolar Furlan di Roma, Anno XL – Luglio – Dicembre 2009 – No.2, page 31
 Polska w Europie, No.5-7, 1984, page 30
 Art Leader, Anno II, No.1, Gennaio-Febbraio 1992, page 57
 Il Poliedro, rassegna d’arte, Marzo/Aprile 1985, Anno XX, page 34
 Piccola Industria, No.7-8, Lulgio-Agosto 1984, page 68
 Omnibus Magazine, No.4, Settembre 2003, page 29
 Omnibus Magazine, No.3, Luglio-Agosto 2003, page 14
 Omnibus Magazine, No.5, Novembre 2003, page 8
 Sport Grand Prix Auto, No.2, Febbraio 1979, page 23
 Farnesearte, Mensile d’arte e, Anno II, No.7-8, Luglio-Agosto 1989, page 18
 La Madonna della Splendore, No.17, 22 Aprile 1998, page 1, 3
 La realita' dell’invisibile, 4-8 Luglio 2007, page 23

External links
 Official Website – Piergiorgio Colautti
 Piergiorgio Colautti – Facebook

Italian contemporary artists
20th-century Italian painters
20th-century Italian male artists
Italian male painters
21st-century Italian painters
Painters from Rome
Living people
1934 births
Italian surrealist artists
Modern painters
Abstract expressionist artists
21st-century Italian male artists